The Naval Academy Preparatory School or NAPS is the preparatory school for the United States Naval Academy. NAPS is located on Naval Station Newport, Rhode Island.  The mission of the Naval Academy Preparatory School is "To enhance Midshipman Candidates' moral, mental, and physical foundations to prepare them for success at the United States Naval Academy".

History
The Naval Academy Preparatory School is the Navy's fourth oldest school; only the Naval War College, the Naval Postgraduate School, and the U.S. Naval Academy at Annapolis, Maryland are older.  Informal preparatory classes began as early as 1915.

In 1918, the Secretary of the Navy Josephus Daniels signed a provision to have up to 100 sailors from the fleet to be eligible for entry to the Academy. Due to the difficult nature of the Naval Academy's entrance examination, then Undersecretary of the Navy Franklin D. Roosevelt (future 32nd President) also allowed for a school to be founded to prepare Sailors and Marines for entry.

The first official classes were established at Naval Station, Newport in Rhode Island and Naval Station Treasure Island / San Francisco in California in 1920. A year later the schools were moved to Norfolk, Virginia and San Diego, California. San Diego classes were later disestablished and NAPS classes remained solely in Norfolk until 1942, when the new Naval Academy Preparatory School opened in Newport, Rhode Island.

NAPS returned to Newport while the Bainbridge Center was temporarily inactive during 15 months  around 1950. When Bainbridge was reactivated in 1951 because of the Korean War, the preparatory school returned to Maryland. In August 1974, NAPS returned to its permanent home in Newport.

From 1915 to the year 1968 NAPS was exclusively for Sailors and Marines who were of "Officer Caliber" but lacked the academic foundation for the rigors at The United States Naval Academy. In 1968, The first male "Direct Entries" were admitted to NAPS. Following the congressional authorization of women to attend all military service academies, women were admitted in 1976.

Although NAPS primarily serves as an institution to prepare Midshipman candidates to attend The United States Naval Academy; from the years 1958 to 2008 and again from 2016 to the present day, it also began to prepare Cadet candidates for the United States Air Force Academy (1958–1961), the United States Coast Guard Academy (1979–2008, 2016–present) and, Midshipman candidates for the United States Merchant Marine Academy (1991 to 2004).
In 2006, The Naval Academy Preparatory School named their newly built dormitory in honor of alumnus Colonel John Ripley. Ripley Hall is located on 440 Meyerkord Avenue in Newport, Rhode Island.

Admissions
To gain admission to the United States Naval Academy upon graduation, Midshipman Candidates must have a GPA above 2.2, no failing grade in any subject, meet the body fat standards, pass the Physical Readiness Test (PRT), improving or sustained course grades and SAT scores, favorable conduct and honor aptitude, and get a favorable recommendation from the Commanding Officer.

Midshipman Candidates who might be below the standard, particularly if they are football players, may still have a chance of admission to USNA. After finals are over, their fate is decided on a day known as Black Monday.

Organization

The mission of the United States Naval Academy Preparatory School is to enhance midshipman candidates' moral, mental, and physical foundations to prepare them for success at the United States Naval Academy. The student body, which is organized as a battalion, is divided into three companies, which are then divided into two platoons. Each platoon is divided into four squads in order to carry out orders with effective results. While attending NAPS, all midshipman candidates are in active duty military status, holding the rank of Midshipman Candidate, equivalent to the Navy's Seaman Recruit, at the enlisted pay grade of E-1, although this is significantly reduced in an effort to allocate funds into the Battalion Activity Fund (BAF) and to pay off all debts owed due for issued uniforms and miscellaneous items. The BAF is used to pay for physical fitness clothing and equipment, textbooks and various student activity expenses, such as the Army-Navy game, Graduation Ball and the like. A common nickname for a Midshipmen Candidates  is "NAPSter".

Within the battalion there exists a midshipman candidate led chain of command. The midshipmen candidates holding positions of authority are called "stripers", because they wear collar devices with the number of stripes that are assigned to each position. Stripers are selected by the military staff and serve the term of one marking period, after which they rotate out with new midshipmen candidates. The responsibilities of stripers are: delegating orders from the senior military staff to the students, taking accountability of the battalion, writing the watchbill for other students, organizing their respective companies and platoons for each event the midshipmen candidates attend, and maintaining general cleanliness of Ripley Hall. The head of the entire battalion is the Battalion Commander and Battalion XO and MA. The Battalion XO is in charge of TAPS sheets every night, which is an accountability process throughout the battalion that ensures all the Midshipman Candidates are back at Ripley Hall safe.

Athletics
NAPS athletics consist of football, lacrosse, men's and women's basketball, baseball, wrestling, men's and women's track & field, and men's and women's cross country running. Most of the athletes will move on to their respective sports at either the USNA or the USCGA after successful completion of their year at NAPS. Midshipmen candidates that are not on any of the school teams, as-well as athletes during their sports off-season, must participate in daily physical training. Each midshipman candidate will take the Physical Readiness Test (PRT), four times throughout the school year. The midshipman candidate must pass the PRT in order to move on to the USNA or the USCGA.

In 1998, a NAPS platoon created the chant I believe that we will win! and used it at NAPS sporting events. These NAPSters brought the chant with them to the USNA where the cheer team adopted it for its sporting events.

Alumni
 Colonel John Ripley, USMC (ret.) NAPS 1958
 Captain Lance Sijan, USAF, NAPS 1961, USAFA 1965, posthumous Medal of Honor, Vietnam
 General Michael J. Williams, USMC (ret.), NAPS 1963, Assistant Commandant USMC
 General John R. Allen, USMC (ret.), NAPS 1972
 Admiral Samuel J. Locklear, III, USN, NAPS 1973, Commander U.S. Pacific Command
 Television host Montel Williams, NAPS 1976
 Rear Admiral Peter Gumataotao, USN, NAPS 1977, Commander Naval Surface Force Atlantic
 Rear Admiral Tim Szymanski, USN, NAPS 1981, slated to command Naval Special Warfare Command in 2016.
 Major General Matthew G. Glavy, USMC, NAPS 1982, Commander, Marine Corps Cyberspace Command
 Captain Christopher J. Cassidy, USN, SEAL, NAPS 1989, NASA Astronaut
 Vice Admiral Robert Harward, USN (ret.), NAPS 1975, Deputy Commander, USCENTCOM
 Captain William Lederer, USN, wrote of his 1930 or 1931 NAPC experiences in his 1950 book, All the Ships at Sea.
 Malcolm Perry, NFL Player
 Major General Austin E. Renforth, USMC, NAPS 1984, Commanding General, Marine Corps Air Ground Combat Center

Notable Past Military Staff
 General James Mattis, USMC (ret.) Executive Officer, 1981-1983

References

External links
Naval Academy Preparatory School's official website
United States Naval Academy's official website
United States Coast Guard Academy's official website

Military high schools in the United States
Newport, Rhode Island
United States Naval Academy
United States Coast Guard Academy
United States Merchant Marine Academy
1915 establishments in Rhode Island